Molière (1622–1673) was a French playwright.

Molière may also refer to:

 Marinus Jan Granpré Molière (1883-1972), Dutch architect
 Molière (1909 film), a short film directed by Léonce Perret
 Molière (1956 film), directed by Norbert Tildian, starring Jean-Paul Belmondo
 Molière (1978 film), directed by Ariane Mnouchkine
 Molière (2007 film), directed by Laurent Tirard
 Molière (crater), on the planet Mercury
 Molière (train), a former train service between France and Germany
 Molière radius, in particle physics, named after Gert Molière, a German physicist
 Molière, an old name given to the Algerian city of Bordj Bounaama during the French occupation
 Molière Award, the national theatre award of France
 The Cabal of Hypocrites, also known as Molière, a 1929 play by Mikhail Bulgakov

See also
 Molières (disambiguation)